The Logan Indians were a Mountain State League minor league baseball team based in Logan, West Virginia United States that played from 1937 to 1942. It was a Class-D team for its first five years, though in its final season it became a Class-C squad. In 1939, it was affiliated with the Cleveland Indians.

Managed by Ed Hock from 1938 to 1941, the team appeared in the league finals three times during that span, winning the championship in 1941.

Pitcher Steve Gromek, who won 123 major league games in 17 seasons and who was an All-Star in 1945, is perhaps the most notable individual to play for the team. He spent 1939 with the squad as a second baseman.

Notable Logan alumni

 Steve Gromek (1939) MLB All-Star

 Grover Hartley (1942)

 Dixie Howell (1937)
Ray Ryan (1942, MGR)

References

External links
Baseball Reference

Baseball teams established in 1937
Defunct minor league baseball teams
Baseball teams disestablished in 1942
Mountain State League teams
Cleveland Guardians minor league affiliates
Professional baseball teams in West Virginia
Defunct baseball teams in West Virginia
1937 establishments in West Virginia
1942 disestablishments in West Virginia